"The First Thing Ev'ry Morning (And the Last Thing Ev'ry Night)" is a song co-written by Jimmy Dean and Ruth Roberts. Dean recorded a single of the song in 1965; it was Dean's second and final number one on the U.S. country singles chart, spending two weeks at number one and a total of sixteen weeks on the chart.

Chart performance

References

1965 singles
Jimmy Dean songs
Songs written by Jimmy Dean
1965 songs
Columbia Records singles
Songs written by Ruth Roberts